Barbara Rittner was the defending champion, but lost in the first round to Marianne Werdel.

Larisa Neiland won the title by defeating Natalia Medvedeva 6–3, 7–5 in the final.

Seeds

Draw

Finals

Top half

Bottom half

References

External links
 Official results archive (ITF)
 Official results archive (WTA)

Women's Singles
1993 WTA Tour